Mer-Égée was one of three short-lived French departments of Greece. It came into existence after Napoleon's conquest in 1797 of the Republic of Venice, when Venetian Greek possessions such as the Ionian islands fell to the French Directory.

History
The department included the islands of Zante (Zakynthos), Kythira and the Strofades, as well as Dragamesto (modern Astakos) on the Greek mainland. Despite its name, the department was mostly not in the Aegean, but the Ionian Sea, apart from Kythira and its dependencies.

Its prefecture was at the town of Zante (Zakynthos). The territories were lost to Russia in 1798 except Dragamesto that was captured by Ali Pasha, ruler of the Pashalik of Yanina, and the department was officially disbanded in 1802.

During the renewed French control of the area in 1807–1809, the department was not re-established, the constitutional form of the Septinsular Republic being kept.

Administration

Commissioner
The Commissioner of the Directory was the highest state representative in the department.

See also 
 Department of Corcyre
 Department of Ithaque
 French rule in the Ionian Islands (1797–1799)
 Treaty of Campo Formio
 History of Zakynthos

References 

 
 
 

Former departments of France in Greece
States and territories established in 1797
History of Zakynthos
1797 establishments in France
States and territories disestablished in 1798